Karl Daniel Nordmark (born 4 January 1988) is a Swedish football player who most recently played for Lidköpings FK.

Club career

Youth years
Larsson played for Lidköpings IF and IF Heimer until 2001 when he left the club for IF Elfsborg.

IF Elfsborg
He made his first team debut in Elfsborg's 0–0 draw away at Hammarby IF on 23 April 2008. Nordmark was not offered a new contract after the 2011 season.

International career
Nordmark has represented Sweden at youth level.

Personal life
Nordmark is a big fan of Italian Serie A and his favourite team is A.S. Roma.

References

External links 
 

1988 births
Living people
Swedish footballers
Sweden under-21 international footballers
Sweden youth international footballers
Association football defenders
Allsvenskan players
IF Elfsborg players
Helsingborgs IF players
Örebro SK players
People from Lidköping Municipality
Association football midfielders
Sportspeople from Västra Götaland County